Hyloxalus sauli is a species of frogs in the family Dendrobatidae. It is found on the eastern Andean slopes in Putumayo, Colombia, and in Sucumbíos, Napo, Orellana, and Pastaza Provinces, Ecuador. It is named after William Saul from the University of Kansas Natural History Museum.

Description
Males measure  and females  in snout–vent length. Dorsum and flanks are coffee-coloured; dorsum has three large blotches. There is a complete, pale oblique lateral stripe. Most individuals also have a ventrolateral stripe that is complete, diffuse, or interrupted.

Reproduction
Male call is a series of two or three quickly repeated peeps. Males and females form pairs and defend territories that can be stable over several months. These are defined by deep burrows used as shelter. Fecundity of females is 6–11 oocytes (based on three females), whereas males have been recorded carrying clutches of 9–13 tadpoles.

Habitat and conservation
It lives under leaf-litter near streams and on overhanging banks of permanent streams.

Hyloxalus sauli is relatively widespread but uncommon species. It is assessed as being of "least concern", but habitat loss and degradation can be localized threats.

References

sauli
Amphibians of the Andes
Amphibians of Colombia
Amphibians of Ecuador
Amphibians described in 1974
Taxonomy articles created by Polbot